The 2014 Waterford Crystal Cup was the ninth staging of the Waterford Crystal Cup since its establishment in 2006. The competition began on 12 January 2014 and ended on 7 February 2014.

Clare were the defending champions but lost out to Tipperary by 4-22 to 3-11 in the final.

Teams

A total of ten teams contested the 2014 Waterford Crystal Cup.

Fixtures

Preliminary round
12 January
UL 1-11 Waterford 0-10	
Limerick 10-17	IT Tralee 0-9
Tipperary 3-20	LIT 0-5

Quarter-finals
19 January
Kerry 0-8 Tipperary 2-16 
WIT 1-20 UL 2-30 
Clare 1-14 Limerick 0-11 
UCC 3-28 Mary I 2-14

Semi-finals
26 January
Clare 2-28 UCC 1-4

2 February
Tipperary 2-30 UL 0-22

Final

References

External links
Waterford Crystal Cup at Munster GAA
2014 Waterford Crystal Cup at Hurling Stats

Waterford
Waterford Crystal Cup